Muonio (previously called Muonionniska) is a municipality of Finland. The town is located in far northern Finland above the Arctic Circle on the country's western border, within the area of the former Lappi (Lapland) province.

The next closest Finnish municipalities are Enontekiö, Kittilä, and Kolari; and to the west is Sweden's Pajala. 
On the south side of town, a road bridge crosses the Muonio River, linking Muonio to northern Norrbotten County, Sweden. Muonio is good base for exploring the many things to do in the area, and is on the E8 highway which goes north to Kilpisjärvi. The municipality is unilingually Finnish, unlike many towns on the Finland–Sweden border.

Muonio is known as the municipality with the longest snow season in Finland. For that reason its vocational college has a top ski class that attracts aspiring cross-country ski champions from all over Finland. The "midnight sun" is above the horizon from 27 May to 17 July (52 days), and the period with continuous daylight lasts a bit longer, polar night from 10 December to 2 January (24 days).

Villages
The villages in Muonio include:
 Ylimuonio
 Kangosjärvi
 Kätkäsuvanto
 Kihlanki
 Särkijärvi

Politics
Results of the 2011 Finnish parliamentary election in Muonio:

Centre Party   27.5%
National Coalition Party   23.2%
True Finns   16.4%
Social Democratic Party   15.9%
Left Alliance   9.8%
Green League   3.0%
Christian Democrats   2.4%
Swedish People's Party   1.5%
Other parties   0.3%

References

External links

Municipality of Muonio – Official website
Information on Muonio's ski resorts and the Lapland super pass

 
Populated places established in 1868
Finland–Sweden border crossings